The Himarimã or Hi-Merimã are an indigenous people of Brazil. They are largely uncontacted by outside society, and live along the Piranha River, between the Juruá and Purus Rivers, in the state of Amazonas.

Their numbers are uncertain, but in 1943 it was estimated that the Hi-Merimã consisted of more than 1,000 individuals. They were known primarily through their conflicts with neighboring tribes. They are considered isolated and mostly uncontacted. They have avoided prolonged contact with outward societies, as well as with neighboring native tribes, with whom they are antagonistic; however, they had some, intermittent contact with non-natives for the last 60 years.

Language
Nothing is known about the Himarimã language.

Notes

Indigenous peoples in Brazil
Amazonas (Brazilian state)
Uncontacted peoples
Indigenous peoples of the Amazon